The Escape Artist is a 2018 novel by Brad Meltzer.

Reception
The review aggregator website Book Marks reported that 92% of critics gave the book a "rave" review, whilst the other 8% of the critics expressed "mixed" impressions, based on a sample of 12 reviews.

Television series adaptation
In February 2021, FX gave a series order for a series based on the book with Michael Bay and Brad Meltzer set to executive produce and Jennifer Lawrence set as the showrunner. In August 2021, Jon Favreau was set to direct the series with Frank Marshall coming onboard to executive produce it.

References

2018 American novels
Books by Brad Meltzer
American thriller novels
Grand Central Publishing books